Anne Russell, Duchess of Bedford ( – 16 June 1762), formerly Lady Anne Egerton, was the wife of Wriothesley Russell, 3rd Duke of Bedford, and, following his death, of William Villiers, 3rd Earl of Jersey. She was the mother of the 4th Earl of Jersey.

Anne was the daughter of Scroop Egerton, 1st Duke of Bridgewater, by his first wife, the former Lady Elizabeth Churchill (herself the daughter of John Churchill, 1st Duke of Marlborough, and Sarah, Duchess of Marlborough). Anne's brother, John Egerton, Viscount Brackley, died at the age of 14. Following her mother's death in 1714, her father remarried, his second wife being Lady Rachel Russell, daughter of Wriothesley Russell, 2nd Duke of Bedford; Lady Rachel was about twenty years younger than her husband, and this second marriage produced seven children, who were Anne's half-siblings. They included John Egerton, 2nd Duke of Bridgewater, and Francis Egerton, 3rd Duke of Bridgewater.

On 22 April 1725, at Ashbridge, Buckinghamshire, Anne married her stepmother's brother, who had succeeded to the dukedom in 1711. A contemporary wrote that: "There resulted an wholly mix-up of relationships". The marriage was not a success, and the couple were childless. The duke was in financial difficulty, and died on 23 October 1732, aged 24, in Corunna, Spain, and Anne became Dowager Duchess, as the dukedom passed to her husband's brother.

On 7 January 1730 she was the sixth signatory to the Ladies' Petition for the Establishment of the Foundling Hospital, a philanthropic effort organised by Thomas Coram for the protection of infants who would otherwise be a risk of being abandoned. 

On 23 June 1733, Anne married William Villiers, 3rd Earl of Jersey, at St. James's, Westminster.

The couple had two sons:
 Frederick William Villiers, Viscount Villiers (1734–1742), who died in childhood.
 George Bussy Villiers, 4th Earl of Jersey (1735–1805), who married Frances Twysden and had children.

References

1700s births
1762 deaths
18th-century English women
18th-century English nobility
Daughters of British dukes
Anne
Jersey
English duchesses
Anne
Anne
Duchesses of Bedford